Leuconia or Leukonia was a town of ancient Ionia, about the possession of which the Chians were involved in a war with Erythrae. It was, according to Plutarch, was a colony of Chios.

Its site is unlocated.

References

Populated places in ancient Ionia
Former populated places in Turkey
Lost ancient cities and towns
Chian colonies